Mulvey may refer to:

People 
 Anthony Mulvey (18821957), Irish nationalist politician
 Callan Mulvey (born 1975), New Zealand-born Australian actor
 Dearie Mulvey (18981968), American co-owner of the Dodgers baseball club, wife of James Mulvey
 Frank Mulvey (191881), Canadian football player
 Gráinne Mulvey (born 1966), Irish composer
 Grant Mulvey (born 1956), Canadian ice hockey player
 Harold M. Mulvey (19142000), American lawyer, Attorney General of Connecticut 196368
 James Mulvey (18991973), American co-owner of the Dodgers baseball club, husband of Dearie Mulvey
 James Mulvey, English drug smuggler
 Joe Mulvey (18581928), American baseball player
 Kevin Mulvey (born 1985), American baseball pitcher
 Laura Mulvey (born 1941), British feminist film theorist
 Logan Mulvey (born 1984), American businessman
 Lorcan Mulvey (born before 2002), Irish Gaelic footballer
 Michael Mulvey (born 1968), American Pulitzer Prize–winning photographer
 Mike Mulvey (born 1963), English football manager
 Nick Mulvey (born 1984), English musician, singer and songwriter
 Paul Mulvey (born 1958), Canadian ice hockey player
 Peter Mulvey (born 1969), American folk singer-songwriter
 Robert Mulvey (18681937), Australian trade unionist and politician
 Sarah Mulvey (19742010), British commissioning editor and television producer
 Sinéad Mulvey (born 1988), Irish singer
 Stewart Mulvey (18341908), Canadian teacher, newspaper editor, militia officer, office holder and politician
 Suzanne Mulvey (born 1984), Scottish female international footballer
 William Mulvey (born 1949), American prelate of the Roman Catholic church

Places 
 Mulvey, Louisiana, an unincorporated community in Vermilion Parish
 Mulvey Park, a city council estate in Windy Arbour, Dundrum, Dublin, Ireland

See also